Mlandege FC is an association football club from Unguja that competes in the Zanzibar Premier League. With seven league titles, it is the joint most successful club in league history along with KMKM. The club was founded in 1970.

Achievements
Zanzibar Premier League : 7
 1996, 1997, 1998, 1998, 2001, 2002, 2020.
•Mapinduzi Cup: 1
2023

International competitions
The following is a list of results for Mlandege FC in international competitions. Mlandege FC’s scores are listed first.

References

External links
Soccerway profile
News at Zanzibar FA
Global Sports Archive profile

Football clubs in Tanzania
Zanzibari football clubs